Serbian poetry includes all poetry written in Serbian, starting from the Middle Ages until present day.

Middle Ages

In the Middle Ages, songs (hymns), including elegies, and services, were written dedicated to Serbian saints. Notable medieval Serbian poets include princess Jefimija (1349–1405), princess Milica (1335–1405), monk Siluan (14th c.), nobleman Dimitrije Kantakuzin (1435–1487).

Epic poetry

Serbian epic poetry is a form of epic poetry created by Serbs originating in today's Serbia, Bosnia and Herzegovina, Croatia, North Macedonia and Montenegro. The main cycles were composed by unknown Serb authors between the 14th and 19th centuries. They are largely concerned with historical events and characters and personages. The instrument in performing the Serbian epic is the Gusle.

Modern
Modernist tendencies in Serbian poetry can be traced back to early Realist writings in the 19th century. Lasting until the end of the First World War, it is often referred to as the “Golden age of Serbian literature“.
Serbian modernist poets were influenced by French Literature.

Contemporary
Contemporary Serbian poetry includes works written since the end of the Second World War until present day. Early contemporary literature was under heavy influence of the Communist ideology. After the Tito–Stalin split, poets returned to their unique writing styles. The last decades of the 20th century were marked by darker, more pessimistic motives coming from the ongoing crises in Yugoslavia, but also the modern world as a whole.

Serbian poetry of the 21st century is very diverse, encompassing various genres and themes.

See also
List of Serb patriotic song
Serbian literature

References

Sources
 

 
Poetry by country